Basiano is a comune (municipality) in the province of Milan in the Italian region Lombardy, located about  northeast of Milan.

Basiano borders the following municipalities: Ornago, Roncello, Trezzano Rosa, Cavenago di Brianza, Pozzo d'Adda, Cambiago, Masate.

References

External links
 Official website

Cities and towns in Lombardy